French Institute Alliance Française (FIAF) is a 501(c)(3) not–for–profit organization incorporated in the State of New York. Its mission is to enhance the knowledge and appreciation of French and Francophone culture, to increase the knowledge of the French language, and to encourage interaction among French, Francophone, and American people through programs in education and the arts.

About FIAF
The Alliance Française de New York was founded in 1898, and the French Institute in 1911 (running the Museum of French Art), operated as two separate organizations, the first teaching French, the second promoting French art. In 1971, they merged to form the French Institute Alliance Française (FIAF), which has become one of the largest centers of French–American culture and education in the United States.

Located on New York City's Upper East Side in a Beaux-Arts building reminiscent of the architecture of Georges-Eugène Haussmann in 19th century Paris, FIAF presents a  mix of arts programs and events in addition to two cultural platforms, Crossing the Line, presented each fall, and World Nomads, presented each spring. FIAF's  Language Center welcomes over 6,000 students each year who learn French from qualified professors, all of whom are native French speakers with a degree in teaching French as a foreign language. FIAF is also home to the Haskell Library, the largest private French library in the United States, and was cited by Time Out New York as one of the city's top cultural institutions.

Cultural programming and events
FIAF presents a  mix of programs in music, dance, theater, cinema, and visual arts in addition to two annual festivals, Crossing the Line, in the fall, and World Nomads, in the spring. FIAF also offers a variety of programs throughout the year including its longstanding weekly cinema series, CinémaTuesdays, Art de Vivre, a lifestyle series bringing the art and style of French living to New York audiences with evenings devoted to food, wine, fashion, and gardening, and the Gallery, which presents exhibitions of French and Francophone contemporary art and photography.

Crossing the Line
Crossing the Line, FIAF's fall festival, was launched in 2007 as a platform to present new works by a range of trans–disciplinary artists from both sides of the Atlantic. Initiated, conceived, and produced by FIAF in partnership with leading New York cultural institutions the festival presents original work with a specific focus on the artist's role as a thinker and catalyst for social change. Crossing the Line is currently curated by Lili Chopra, Simon Dove, and Gideon Lester.

World Nomads
World Nomads, which launched in 2008, is a month–long series each spring which focuses on transculturalism and the cross–cultural exchange of artistic style, expression, and ideas. Serving as a platform for dialogue between French and Francophone cultures, World Nomads features programs in theater, film, music, visual arts, and literature.
World Nomads has presented the cultures of Africa, Haiti, and Lebanon over the first three editions.

Social Events
In addition to its two annual festivals and its cinema series, FIAF hosts cultural events such as its Art de Vivre series, which focuses on the art of French living. This series includes events such as fashion talks and wine tastings, culinary workshops as well as gardening, and has brought to FIAF Catherine Malandrino, Diane von Fürstenberg, Marc Jacobs, Tommy Hilfiger, and Mireille Guiliano.
Music concerts, plays, and literary talks, are also among FIAF's yearly cultural programming. Artists such as singer Jane Birkin, and actor Édouard Baer have performed in FIAF's Florence Gould Hall, and authors such as Paul Auster, Bernard-Henri Lévy, Francine du Plessix Gray, and Edmund White, have come to FIAF to discuss their respective works.

Events en français
While most of the events at FIAF are held in English, many events, such as the social event Rendez–Vous, FIAF's annual celebration of Beaujolais Nouveau and Bastille Day, are held in French and offer opportunities to speak French and meet Francophiles.

Florence Gould Hall

Florence Gould Hall is a 361-seat, proscenium stage theatre and concert hall operated by the French Institute Alliance Française at 55 East 59th Street (between Madison and Park Avenues).  It opened in the spring of 1988.

It is often the site of New York Theatre Ballet productions such as the Nutcracker, but is mostly home to French cultural events, as per the mission of FIAF.

Language Center
The Language Center attracts over 6,000 students each year, offering courses at all levels from toddlers to adults, including, among others, thematic courses and corporate instruction. The Language Center has offered classes in New York City since 2008 and also offers instruction in Montclair, New Jersey.

Haskell Library
Completely renovated by architect Michael Graves in 1998, FIAF's Haskell Library offers over 40,000 books, magazines, CDs, and DVDs for both adults and children. The library is accessible to FIAF members and students only.

Family programs
FIAF hosts educational and family programs such as French movies for kids with Cinékids, as well as Contes et Confettis and à petit pas story hours with stories and creative arts and crafts workshops.

FIAF Gallery
Since 2007, the FIAF Gallery has been exhibiting contemporary French and Francophone artists such as Arman, Visual System, Greg Lauren, Ryoji Ikeda, and Matthew Pillsbury.

References

External links
 French Institute Alliance Française, official website
Crossing the Line festival
Fondation Alliance française
Facebook
Twitter

French-American culture in New York City
Alliance Française
Educational institutions established in 1898
1898 establishments in New York City